Alexander Hale Smith (June 2, 1838 – August 12, 1909) was the third surviving son of Joseph Smith and Emma Hale Smith. Smith was born in Far West, Missouri, and was named after Alexander Doniphan, who had refused an order to execute Joseph Smith, and then was Joseph's defense attorney during Joseph's incarceration at Liberty Jail. Alexander Smith became a senior leader of the Reorganized Church of Jesus Christ of Latter Day Saints (RLDS Church, now Community of Christ). Smith served as an apostle and as Presiding Patriarch of the church. He became religiously inclined after the April 1862 death of his older brother Frederick G. W. Smith (b. 1836), who had not been baptized, and was baptized on May 25, 1862, in Nauvoo, Illinois, by another older brother, Joseph Smith III.

Alexander was ordained an apostle on April 10, 1873, and "served a mission to the Pacific Slope" with David Hyrum Smith in 1875. He was ordained president of the Council of Twelve on April 15, 1890, at Lamoni, Iowa. He was called to be a counselor to his brother, Joseph Smith III, and also a patriarch and evangelical minister on April 12, 1897. He went on a mission to Australia, Hawaii, and the Society Islands in 1901. Smith was a partner in a photograph gallery before becoming a carpenter.

Smith married Elizabeth Agnes Kendall in Nauvoo, on May 23, 1861. A History of Decatur County, Iowa, published in 1915, provides many details about his life and his personality:

He loved the wide outdoors, land and water and sky, and delighted in athletic sports, holding a record in his younger days as one of the best skaters and one of the two surest shots in the community. Of the nine children born to him, one daughter, Mrs. Grace Madison, died and is buried in San Bernardino, California, and one son, Don A., is buried at Lamoni. The second daughter, Mrs. Ina I. Wright, lived at Avalon, New South Wales, Australia, and Mrs. Coral Horner lived near Davis City, Iowa, she spent the later years of her life with her husband in Ronan, Montana. Mrs. Emma Kennedy and the youngest sons, Joseph G. and Arthur M., resided at Independence, Missouri, while the oldest children, Fred A. and Mrs. Heman C. Smith, were residents of Lamoni, where the widow still lived in their home on the south side.

Notes

External links
 photograph of Alexander Hale Smith at josephmithsr.com
 Rare photograph of Frederick Granger Williams Smith, Alexander Hale Smith and other surviving sons of Joseph Smith

1838 births
1909 deaths
19th-century American people
20th-century American people
American leaders of the Community of Christ
Apostles of the Community of Christ
Smith family (Latter Day Saints)
Doctrine and Covenants people
People from Far West, Missouri
People from Nauvoo, Illinois
People from Lamoni, Iowa
Presidents of the Council of Twelve Apostles (Community of Christ)
Children of Joseph Smith